The Law Society of Nunavut (Inuinnaqtun: Nunavumi Maligaliuqtit) is the law society responsible for licensing and self-regulation of the legal profession in the Canadian territory of Nunavut. It is based in the territorial capital of Iqaluit. The society was established in 1999 when Nunavut was created from portions of the Northwest Territories, most LSN members were formerly members of the Law Society of the Northwest Territories.

LSN operates in English and French, with an additional legal aid hotline offering services in Inuktitut.

Governance

The Society has governing executive headed by a President and 4 other officers. The administrative unit has 3 members headed by a Chief Executive Officer.

References

Nunavut
Nunavut law
1999 establishments in Nunavut
Organizations established in 1999